The 1875 Kirkcaldy Burghs by-election was fought on 20 April 1875.  The byelection was fought due to the death of the incumbent Liberal MP, Robert Reid.  It was won by the Liberal candidate George Campbell.

References

1875 elections in the United Kingdom
1875 in Scotland
1870s elections in Scotland
19th century in Fife
Politics of Fife
Kirkcaldy
By-elections to the Parliament of the United Kingdom in Scottish constituencies
April 1875 events